Medinah School District 11 is an elementary school district headquartered in Roselle, Illinois. In addition to portions of Roselle and Medinah, it also serves a very small portion of Bloomingdale.

It operates three schools: Medinah Primary School and Medinah Intermediate School in Medinah and Medinah Middle School in Roselle.

References

External links
 
School districts in DuPage County, Illinois
Roselle, Illinois
Medinah, Illinois
Bloomingdale, Illinois